The Argasidae are the family of soft ticks, one of the three families of ticks. The family contains 193 species, although the composition of the genera is less certain, and more study is needed before the genera can become stable. The currently accepted genera are Antricola, Argas, Nothoaspis, Ornithodoros, and Otobius. The Argasidae are very common in South Asia, along with 96 other species of ticks, making South Asia the region with the highest biodiversity of ticks worldwide. Soft ticks are resistant to desiccation and can live for several years in arid conditions.

Physical characteristics
Soft ticks lack the hard scutum present in the hard ticks (Ixodidae). The gnathosoma (or capitulum, the mouthparts-bearing structure) is located on the underside of the animal's body and is not readily visible, while in the Ixodidae, the gnathosoma projects forward from the body. The lateral edges of the body are rounded.

See also
Ticks of domestic animals

References

External links

 
Ticks
Acari families
Taxa named by Carl Ludwig Koch